Kufrsoum SC is a Jordanian football club which is based in the village of Kufrsoum, Jordan, just outside the city of :Irbid. The football club competes in the Jordan league.

Current squad

Managerial history 
  Mohammad Falah Obeidat
  Islam Al-Thiabat
  Abdel-Nasser Obeidat
  Hashim Al-Shalabi
  Mohammad Ababneh
  Mohammad Khatam
  Murad Al-Hourani
  Najeh Thiabat

Honors
Jordan FA Shield: 1
 1998

Kit providers
Adidas
Uhlsport
Puma

External links
Kufer Soum SC (19/20)
فريق: كفرسوم
Jordan - Kfarsoum - Results, fixtures, squad, statistics, photos, videos and news - Soccerway
Kfarsoum Soccer Team Results, Fixtures, live scores - FootLive

Football clubs in Jordan
1973 establishments in Jordan